The 1965 Hong Kong Urban Council election was held on 3 March 1965 for the six of the ten elected seats of the Urban Council of Hong Kong after the membership of the elected members increased from eight to ten.

As for the previous election, there were four polling stations: City Hall in Central, North Point Government Primary School, Aberdeen Government Primary School, East wing of the Star Ferry Pier in South Kowloon and Queen Elizabeth School. Turnout was 6,492 of 29,349 eligible voters, approximately 22 percent. The Civic–Reform Coalition had collapsed in 1964, but the dominance of the two groups continued separately. Both groups won three seats each in the election, maintaining the balance of power in the Council, with Henry Hu representing Reform Club was elected for the first time.

On election day afternoon, six members of the Labour Party protested peacefully for two hours at Edinburgh Place outside the City Hall poll station with slogans of "Abolish Urban Council", "Support Labour don't vote", and "Give Hong Kong democracy". They criticised the Urban Council as powerless to manage matters that had real impact on Hong Kong residents, and that of Hong Kong's population of nearly four million, fewer than 30,000 people had the right to vote.

Elected members

Citations

References
 Lau, Y.W. (2002). A history of the municipal councils of Hong Kong : 1883-1999 : from the Sanitary Board to the Urban Council and the Regional Council. Leisure and Cultural Service Dept. 
 Pepper, Suzanne (2008). Keeping Democracy at Bay:Hong Kong and the Challenge of Chinese Political Reform. Rowman & Littlefield.

Hong Kong
1965 in Hong Kong
Urban
March 1965 events in Asia
1965 elections in the British Empire